La Nouvelle Revue Française ("The New French Review") is a literary magazine based in France. In France, it is often referred to as the NRF.

History and profile
The magazine was founded in 1909 by a group of intellectuals including André Gide, Jacques Copeau, and Jean Schlumberger. It was established 'in opposition to other, more established, cultural institutions, most notably the Académie Française and its associated networks'.:4

In 1911, Gaston Gallimard became editor of the Revue, which led to the founding of the publishing house, Éditions Gallimard. During World War I its publication stopped. The magazine was relaunched in 1919.

Established writers such as Paul Bourget and Anatole France contributed to the magazine from its early days. The magazine's influence grew until, during the interwar period, it became the leading literary journal, occupying a unique role in French culture. The first published works by André Malraux and Jean-Paul Sartre were in the pages of the Revue.

During the occupation in the second world war Gide and Général de Gaulle gave explicit blessing to L'Arche (:fr:L'Arche (revue littéraire)), a literary review created by Jean Amrouche and edited by Edmond Charlot.<ref>JAFFEUX, V. 2016.L'Arche au milieu de la tempête. Naissance d'une revue algéroise dans la tourmente de la seconde guerre mondiale. In: DUGAS, G. (ed.) Edmond Charlot: passeur de culture: Actes du colloque Montpellier-Pézenas. Centenaire Edmond Charlot 2015. Pézenas: Domens.</ref> It became effectively the replacement of the NRF in Free France (Algeria was the first part of France to be liberated).  L'Arche commenced in 1944 (issues 1–6) and finished in 1947 (issues 23–27). Montreal, Tangiers and Algiers in this period became literary francophone centres replacing Paris. After liberation of the whole of France, NRF was banned for collaborationism, but reopened in 1953 (initially with a "new" title: La Nouvelle Nouvelle Revue Française).

The Revue was a monthly for many years, but became a quarterly.

 Directors 
1908–1914: André Gide
 Interruption due to war
1919–1925: Jacques Rivière 
1925–1940: Jean Paulhan
1940–1943: Pierre Drieu La Rochelle
 Banned for collaborationism (1944–1953)
1953–1968: Jean Paulhan
1968–1977: Marcel Arland 
1977–1987: Georges Lambrichs
1987–1996: Jacques Réda
1996–1999: Bertrand Visage
1999–2010: Michel Braudeau
2010–present: Antoine Gallimard

See also
Collection Blanche
List of literary magazines
 Mauthner, Martin, Otto Abetz and His Paris Acolytes - French Writers Who Flirted with Fascism, 1930–1945. Sussex Academic Press, 2016,

References
 

Anna-Louise Milne, The Extreme In-Between: Jean Paulhan's Place in the Twentieth Century'' (Oxford: Legenda, 2006)

External links 
 [https://www.lanrf.fr/ Catalog]

1909 establishments in France
French-language magazines
Literary magazines published in France
Magazines established in 1909
Monthly magazines published in France
Quarterly magazines published in France